For Which We Stand, is a full-length documentary film. The film highlights LGBTQ and straight artists through numerous interviews with musicians and music-industry insiders, as well as live performances and behind-the-scenes footage.

The participants include Michael Musto, Dolly Parton, Melissa Etheridge, Frenchie Davis, Diana King, Chely Wright, and transgender violinist and vocalist Tona Brown.

The film was directed by Sean Robinson and produced by Paul Warner.

Quotes
Director Sean Robinson says of the film, "I’m very excited to be directing this socially and politically pro-active feature-length documentary film that will not only spotlight queer music culture, but will keep the torch of LARA burning as the fight for equality moves into the next era."

Producer Paul Warner says: "While experiencing considerable gains, there has also been an escalation of bullying and continued discrimination, so the pursuit of equality is far from over. Of equal importance, I am excited to collaborate with music and media artists from all disciplines whose passion for and undying dedication to their craft will shape our future cultural and political landscape."

Cast
 Michael Musto as himself
 Dolly Parton as herself
 Melissa Etheridge as herself
 Frenchie Davis as herself
 Diana King as herself
 Chely Wright as herself
 Frenchie Davis as herself
 Tona Brown as herself
 Antoine Ashley as herself
 Vicci Martinez as herself
 Todd Alsup as himself
 Deepa Soul as herself
 Pat Spearman as herself
 James Healey as himself
 Athena Reich as herself
 Christine Martucci as herself

References

External links

Metro Weekly

2015 films
2010s English-language films
2015 documentary films
Documentary films about music and musicians
Documentary films about LGBT topics
American documentary films
2015 LGBT-related films
2010s American films